Did Jesus Exist? may refer to:
 Did Jesus Exist? (Ehrman book), 2012 book by formerly Christian, now agnostic New Testament scholar Bart Ehrman
 Did Jesus Exist? (Wells book), 1975 book by modern German historian George Albert Wells

See also
 Christ myth theory, a hypothesis that Jesus never existed